Glow Up is a Philippine television lifestyle informative show broadcast by GMA News TV. Hosted by Winwyn Marquez, Thia Thomalla and Michelle Dee, it premiered on June 9, 2019 on the network's Sunday evening line up. The show concluded on March 15, 2020.

Premise
The show features tips and guides regarding fashion and lifestyle. Each episode will also feature a make-over transformation.

Hosts
 Winwyn Marquez
 Thia Thomalla
 Michelle Dee

Production
The production was halted in March 2020 due to the enhanced community quarantine in Luzon caused by the COVID-19 pandemic.

Accolades

References

External links
 

2019 Philippine television series debuts
2020 Philippine television series endings
Filipino-language television shows
GMA News TV original programming
Philippine television shows
Television productions suspended due to the COVID-19 pandemic